Aeroperú Flight 603 was a scheduled passenger flight from Miami International Airport in Miami, Florida, to Comodoro Arturo Merino Benítez International Airport in Santiago, Chile, with stopovers in Quito, Ecuador, and Lima, Peru. On October 2, 1996, the Boeing 757-23A aircraft flying the final leg of the flight crashed, killing all 70 people aboard.

Flying over water, at night, with no visual references, the pilots were unaware of their true altitude, and struggled to control and navigate the aircraft. The investigation determined that the air data computers were unable to show correct airspeed and altitude on cockpit displays because a maintenance worker had failed to remove tape covering the pitot-static system ports on the aircraft exterior.

Overview

Aircraft 
The aircraft, a Boeing 757-23A was delivered new from Boeing on December 2, 1992, to Ansett Worldwide. It was leased to Aeroméxico on 27 September 1993 and then sub-leased to Aeroperú on April 1, 1994. The lease transferred back to Ansett in February 1995, and Aeroperú continued to operate the aircraft until it crashed.

Crew 
The captain was 58-year-old Eric Schreiber Ladrón de Guevara, who had logged almost 22,000 flight hours (including 1,520 hours on the Boeing 757). The first officer was 42-year-old David Fernández Revoredo, who had logged almost 8,000 flight hours, with 719 of them on the Boeing 757.

Accident 
On October 1, 1996, Aeroperú Flight 603 from Miami International Airport had landed at the Lima Airport. There were 180 passengers on the first leg of the flight on a  Boeing 757. Of those, 119 had exited the plane, and the remaining passengers were transferred to another Boeing 757.

This aircraft took off 42 minutes after midnight (05:42 UTC) on October 2, and the crew immediately discovered that their basic flight instruments were behaving erratically, and reported receiving contradictory serial emergency messages from the flight management computer, including the altitude and airspeed indicator, rudder ratio, mach speed trim, overspeed, underspeed and flying too low. The crew declared an emergency and requested an immediate return to the airport.

The pilots incorrectly believed that they could figure out the actual aircraft altitude by asking the controller, but neither the pilots nor the controller realized that the altitude information displayed on the controller's screen was sent from the aircraft's Mode C Transponder. As the transponder was receiving the same erroneous altitude information being displayed on the aircraft's altimeter, the altitude on the controller's display was also incorrect.

Faced with a lack of reliable basic flight instrument readings, constant contradictory warnings from the aircraft's flight computer (some of which were valid and some of which were not) and believing that they were at a safe altitude, the crew decided to begin descent for the approach to the airport. Since the flight was at night over water, no visual references were available to convey to the pilots their true altitude or to aid their descent. As a consequence of the pilots' inability to precisely monitor the aircraft's airspeed or vertical speed, they experienced multiple stalls, resulting in rapid loss of altitude with no corresponding change on the altimeter. While the altimeter indicated an altitude of approximately 9,700 feet, the aircraft's true altitude was much lower.

The air traffic controller instructed a Boeing 707 to take off and to help guide the 757 in to land, but it was too late. The 757's left wingtip clipped the water approximately 25 minutes after the emergency declaration, tearing off several feet of the left wing. The pilots desperately clawed for altitude and managed to get the 757 airborne again for 22 seconds, but due to the damage to the left wing the aircraft rolled over and slammed into the water inverted. All 70 passengers and crew died.

Passengers 
About half of the passengers on the flight were Chileans returning to Chile.

Of the passengers, 21 originated from Miami; all of the originating passengers were Chilean. An additional 10 passengers had boarded in Quito. The remaining passengers had boarded in Lima.

Aftermath

Search, rescue, and recovery 
After the crash, recovery crews found nine bodies floating, but 61 bodies had sunk with the aircraft.

Investigation 
The Commission of Accident Investigations (CAI) of the Director General of Air Transport (DGAT) of Peru wrote the final accident report.

The chief Peruvian accident investigator, Guido Fernández Lañas, was the uncle of the co-pilot, David Fernández. There were some reservations about the potential conflict of interest, but the National Transportation Safety Board-appointed investigator, Richard Rodriguez, determined that Fernández Lañas could properly investigate the accident.

The Peruvian Navy collected the floating wreckage. After the Peruvian authorities asked for assistance, the United States Navy provided equipment to locate the underwater wreckage of the Boeing 757 and retrieve its flight data recorder and cockpit voice recorder.

Later investigation into the accident revealed that adhesive tape had been accidentally left over some or all of the static ports (on the underside of the fuselage) after the aircraft was cleaned and polished, eventually leading to the crash. Employee Eleuterio Chacaliaza had left the tape on by mistake.

The static ports are vital to the operation of virtually all of those flight instruments that provide basic aerodynamic data such as airspeed, altitude and vertical speed, not only to the pilots but also to the aircraft's computers, which provide additional functions, such as warnings when flight characteristics approach dangerous levels. The blockage of all of the static ports is one of the few common-failure modes resulting in total failure of multiple basic flight instruments and as such is regarded as one of the most serious faults that can occur within the avionics systems.

The design of the aircraft did not incorporate a system of maintenance covers for the static ports. Such covers are commonly employed in aviation for blocking access to critical components when the aircraft is not in operation and are generally a bright color and carry flags (which may have "remove before flight" markings). Instead, the design of the aircraft and the relevant maintenance procedure called for the use of adhesive tape to cover the ports.

As a result of the blocked static ports, the basic flight instruments relayed false airspeed, altitude and vertical speed data. Because the failure was not in any of the instruments, but rather in a common supporting system, thereby defeating redundancy, the erroneous altimeter data was also broadcast to air traffic control, which was attempting to provide the pilots with basic flight data. This led to extreme confusion in the cockpit as the pilots were provided with some data (altitude) which seemed to correlate correctly with instrument data (altimeter) while the other data provided by ATC (approximate airspeed) did not agree. Although the pilots were quite cognizant of the possibility that all of the flight instruments were providing inaccurate data, the correlation between the altitude data given by ATC and that on the altimeter likely further compounded the confusion. Also contributing to their difficulty were the numerous cockpit alarms that the computer system generated, which conflicted both with each other and with the instruments. This lack of situational awareness was revealed by the cockpit voice recorder transcript. That the flight took place at night and over water, thus not giving the pilots any visual references, was also identified as a major factor. The official accident report concluded that the flight crew, distracted by the conflicting warnings, did not heed the radar altimeter reading after descending through 2,500 feet.

Legal settlement
Mike Eidson, an American attorney, represented 41 passengers and crew in a lawsuit contending that the aircraft's manufacturer, Boeing, bore responsibility for the disaster, as the company ought to have foreseen the misuse of its products. The suit was filed against Boeing in federal court in Miami in May 1997. According to the complaint, the flightdeck errors were caused by careless maintenance by Aeroperú and negligence and defective design by Boeing. Boeing argued that it was not at fault, and that responsibility for the accident lay with the employee who did not remove the tape from the static ports, and the aircraft's pilot for not noticing the tape still applied by visual check. Richard Rodriguez of the NTSB said that it was understandable that Schreiber did not find the tape because the maintenance worker had used duct tape instead of the brightly colored tape that he was supposed to use. In addition, Rodriguez said that the pitot-static ports were high above the ground, meaning that Schreiber could not have seen the tape against the fuselage. After extensive litigation, the parties agreed to transfer the case against Boeing and Aeroperú to an international arbitration in Santiago, for a determination of the damages. The defendants agreed to not contest liability in Chile.

On December 13, 1999, family members of the flight's passengers received one of the largest compensations stemming from an aviation accident outside the United States aboard a non-U.S. carrier, averaging nearly $1 million per victim. Mayday stated that the manner of the crash resulting in the passengers' drowning was responsible for the large settlements.

Aeroperú as a whole 

After the accident, Aeroperú changed the number of its evening Miami-Lima-Santiago Boeing 757 service to Flight 691. The Flight 603 incident contributed to the eventual demise of Aeroperú, which was already plagued with financial and management difficulties. As a result of the crash of Flight 603 and the large amount of money paid for the settlements  (which had aggravated the already existing financial issues even further), Aeroperú declared bankruptcy and ceased all operations in March 1999.

Criminal prosecution 
Chacaliaza was convicted in Peru for negligent homicide and given a two-year suspended sentence in 1998. Four other defendants were acquitted. Chacaliaza said he would appeal the ruling, claiming that sabotage brought down the plane and that he had removed the adhesive tape.

Peruvian air accident investigator Guido Fernández criticised the ruling, stating that the maintenance worker was relatively uneducated and had little understanding of what he did. Fernández argued that his supervisors bore more responsibility, yet Chacaliaza was the one prosecuted by the system.

To this day, it is not known why he used duct-tape instead of the brightly colored tape that he was supposed to apply.

In popular culture
 The events of Flight 603 were featured in "Flying Blind", a Season 1 (2003) episode of the Canadian TV series Mayday. The flight was also included in a Mayday Season 6 (2007) Science of Disaster special titled "Who's Flying the Plane?"
 The cockpit voice recording (CVR) of the incident was incorporated into the script of a play called Charlie Victor Romeo, by the Lower East Side theater company in New York, in 1999.

See also

 Pitot-static system

Similar events
 Air India Flight 855
 Birgenair Flight 301, which also took place in 1996 and also involved a 757-200, with similar circumstances
 Air France Flight 447
 Adam Air Flight 574
 Lion Air Flight 610
 Indonesia AirAsia Flight 8501
West Air Sweden Flight 294
Turkish Airlines Flight 5904

References

External links

Final Report (unofficial English translation) (Archive Alternative of archive) hosted at SKYbrary
 Original report, in Spanish, by the Accident Investigation Board, Directorate General of Air Transport, Ministry of Transportation and Communications
 "In reply refer to: A-96-141." National Transportation Safety Board. November 15, 1996. (Archive)
AvWeb - AeroPeru 603 Cockpit Voice Recorder transcript (English) (Archive)
AvWeb - AeroPeru 603 Cockpit Voice Recorder transcript (Spanish) (Archive)

 "Computer failure puzzling in Peruvian crash." CNN. October 3, 1996.
 "Searchers comb Pacific for more bodies after Peruvian crash," CNN. October 2, 1996. (Archive)
List of passengers (Archive Alternative of archive)
 News and Comment on the Aeroperu B757 Accident - University of Bielefeld

1996 in Peru
1990s in Lima
1990s in Miami
Airliner accidents and incidents caused by instrument failure
Airliner accidents and incidents caused by maintenance errors
Aviation accidents and incidents in 1996
Aviation accidents and incidents in Peru
Aviation accidents and incidents in the Pacific Ocean
Accidents and incidents involving the Boeing 757
Flight 603
October 1996 events in South America
1996 disasters in Oceania
1996 disasters in Peru